The Women's Meijin is one of the eight major titles of women's professional shogi. The title is awarded yearly to the winner of the a best-of-five match between the defending Women's Meijin and a challenger determined through league play. The current Women's Meijin titleholder is Tomoka Nishiyama.

Founded in 1974, the Women's Meijin is the oldest of the women's major titles. The title match and league play is currently cosponsored by the Japanese daily sports newspaper Sports Hochi with additional support being provided by the Japanese company Universal Entertainment. The tournament is officially known as the Okada Museum of Art Women's Meijin Tournament after the Okada Museum of Art, which is affiliated with Universal Entertainment.

History
Up until 1974, there had no been system specifically for women players within the Japan Shogi Association (JSA) and they were expected to meet the same promotion and ranking rules as men if they wanted to obtain full professional status as a shogi player. In 1974, Yasuharu Ōyama, the then-president of the JSA, expressed his desire to try and increase the popularity of shogi among women, and began to discuss the establishment of a separate system within the JSA for women shogi players. At the same, time the establishment of a new tournament solely for such women was also being discussed and the Hochi Shimbun Corporation was approached in September 1974 over the possibility of becoming this new tournament's sponsor. The Hochi Shimbun agreed to sponsor the tournament and it was officially established in October 1974 as the Women's Professional Meijin Tournament.

Takojima was seeded into the final match in consideration of her previous accomplishments as an apprentice professional with the remaining five women playing a tournament to determine which one would advance to the final match. Terashita won the tournament, but lost to Takojima 2 games to none in the best-of-three final match; thus Takojima was the first person to be award the title of Women's Meijin.

Starting with the 2nd Women's Professional Meijin Tournament, the defending Women's Meijin was automatically seeded into the title match, and the challenger was determined through league play. The title match remained a best-of-three series until 1980 when it changed to a best-of-five series.

From the 29th Meijin (20023) until the 35th Meijin (20089), the tournament was officially known as the Aruze Women's Meijin Tournament after the former name of the Universal Entertainment Corporation. The tournament's name changed to the Universal Women's Meijin Tournament from the 36th Women's Meijin Tournament (200910) until the 42nd Meijin Tournament (201415) to reflect name change of Aruze to Universal. It adopted its current name Okada Museum of Art Women's Meijin Tournament after the Okada Museum of Art, which is affiliated with Universal Entertainment, in March 2015.

The kanji character  was originally part of the tournament's official Japanese name when it was established in 1974. This was done primarily out of deference to the regular professional shogi players who competed for the Meijin title so as to acknowledge its higher status. In March 2014, however, the Japan Shogi Association announced that character was being officially dropped from the tournaments name to not only commemorate the 40th anniversary of the establishment of the women's professional system and the Women's Meijin tournament, but also to recognize the strides women's professional shogi made since 1974.

Format
The tournament consists of three parts: a preliminary round, a challengers league and a title match. Tournament play begins in April to coincide with the beginning of the new shogi season with the title match taking place in January and February of the following calendar year.

All active women's professional shogi players (including LPSA and unaffiliated women's professionals) are eligible to participate in the preliminary round, which consists of four single-elimination tournaments in which the winner of each tournament advances to the challengers league. The time control for preliminary round games is two hours per player.

The challengers league consists of ten players who are seeded based upon their performance in the previous years' tournament. It is a round-robin tournament with a time control of two hours per game with the winner advancing to the title match against the defending Women's Meijin. If two of more players tie for first place, a playoff is held with the format depending upon the number of players involved. Players finishing second through fifth place remain in the league and are re-seeded for the following year, while the bottom four finishers are relegated from the league and need to re-qualify via the preliminary tournaments. In cases where relegation is unclear due to ties, a playoff is held to determine which player remains in the challengers league.

The title match is a best-of-five format between the defending Women's Meijin and the winner of the challengers league with the time control for each game being three hours per player. The winner is awarded the title of "Women's Meijin", while the loser becomes the first seed in the challenger league for the next tournament cycle.

Queen Meijin
The lifetime title of "Queen Meijin" is awarded to those players who have won the title five times or more. The title is officially awarded once the player has retired from active play.  three players have qualified for the title: Hiroe Nakai (1992), Ichiyo Shimizu (1996) and Kana Satomi (2013).

Past winners
Below is a list of past Women Meijin title holders. From 1974 until 1980, the title match was a best-of-three series. The number in parenthesis represents the total times a player has won the title.

Records
 Most Women's Meijin titles: Satomi Kana (12)
 Most consecutive Women's Meijin titles: Satomi Kana (12)
 Most appearances in Women's Meijin title match: Ichiyo Shimizu (20)

Meijin League
The challenger for the Meijin title is determined through a 10-player league system in which the winner of the league advances to the title match against the reigning Meijin. Players are seeded based upon their results in the previous year's league, with the top seed being the loser of the previous year's title match. The four lowest finishers in league play each year are demoted from the league and must requalify through single-elimination preliminary tournaments. The remaining five players are re-seeded from two to six based upon their results from the previous year, and the four winners of the preliminary tournaments are seeded as a joint number seven seed. Ties between players to determine the league's winner and which players are demoted are resolved through playoff games.

Notes

References

External links
 
 
 

Recurring sporting events established in 1974
 
Shogi tournaments